The Catholic Church in East Timor is part of the worldwide Catholic Church, under the spiritual leadership of the Pope in Rome. Since its independence from Indonesia, East Timor became only the second predominantly Catholic country in Asia (after the Philippines), a legacy of its status as a former Portuguese colony. About 98.3% of the population is Catholic in East Timor as of 2006, which means over 1,000,000 faithful.

The country was divided into three dioceses: Dili, Baucau and Maliana (erected in 2010). These dioceses are immediately subject to the Holy See.

The Apostolic Nuncio to East Timor is concurrently the nuncio to Indonesia. The position has been vacant since 11 October 2019, and the nunciature is located in Jakarta.

History

In the early 16th century, Portuguese and Dutch traders made contact with East Timor. A Dominican mission was sent by the bishop of Malacca to Solor in 1562, and became established at Lifau in present-day East Timor in 1641. Portugal took over and maintained control of East Timor until 1974, with a brief occupation by Japan during World War II.

Indonesia invaded East Timor in 1975 and annexed the former Portuguese colony. East Timorese animist belief systems did not fit with Indonesia's constitutional monotheism, resulting in mass conversions to Christianity. Portuguese clergy were replaced with Indonesian priests and Latin and Portuguese mass was replaced by Indonesian mass. Officially splitting from the Portuguese Church in 1975, the Church in East Timor never joined the Indonesian Church. The Church played an important role in society during the Indonesian occupation of East Timor. While just 20% of East Timorese called themselves Catholics at the time of  the 1975 invasion, the figure surged to reach 95% by the end of the first decade after the invasion. During the occupation,  Bishop Carlos Ximenes Belo became one of the most prominent advocates for human rights in East Timor and many priests and nuns risked their lives in defending citizens from military abuses. Pope John Paul II's 1989 visit to East Timor exposed the occupied territory's situation to world media and provided a catalyst for independence activists to seek global support. Officially neutral, the Vatican wished to retain good relations with Indonesia, the world's largest Muslim nation. Upon his arrival in East Timor, the Pope symbolically kissed a cross then pressed it to the ground, alluding to his usual practice of kissing the ground on arrival in a nation, and yet avoiding overtly suggesting East Timor was a sovereign country. He spoke fervently against abuses in his sermon, whilst avoiding naming the Indonesian authorities as responsible. The Pope spoke out against violence in East Timor, and called for both sides to show restraint, imploring the East Timorese to "love and pray for their enemies."

In 1996, Bishop Carlos Filipe Ximenes Belo and José Ramos-Horta, two leading East Timorese activists for peace and independence, received the Nobel Peace Prize for ""their work towards a just and peaceful solution to the conflict in East Timor".

A number of priests and nuns were murdered in the violence in East Timor that followed the 1999 Independence referendum. The newly independent nation declared three days of national mourning upon the death of Pope John Paul II in 2005.

The Catholic Church remains very involved in politics, with its 2005 confrontations with the government over religious education in school and the forgoing of war crimes trials for atrocities against East Timorese by Indonesia. They have also endorsed the new Prime Minister in his efforts to promote national reconciliation. In June 2006 Catholic Relief Services received aid from the United States to help victims of months of unrest in the country. The number of churches has grown from 100 in 1974 to over 800 in 1994.

Since 2015, the Salesians of Don Bosco and  the Daughters of Mary Help of Christians with the help of an international relief organization Stop Hunger Now, have been providing  more than 1,100 students across the country with better nutrition through fortified rice-meals.

See also 

 List of Catholic dioceses in East Timor
 Archdiocese of Díli (erected 1940 from the Roman Catholic Diocese of Macau)
 Diocese of Baucau (erected 1996 from Roman Catholic Diocese of Díli)
 Diocese of Maliana (erected 2010 from Roman Catholic Diocese of Díli)
 Religion in East Timor

References

 
East Timor
East Timor